Battle of the Baltic may refer to:

Battle of Copenhagen (1801), between the United Kingdom and Denmark-Norway during the War of the Second Coalition
Battle of the Baltic (poem)
Battle of Copenhagen (1807), between the United Kingdom and Denmark-Norway during the Gunboat War
British campaign in the Baltic (1918–19) against Soviet Russia as part of the Allied intervention in the Russian Civil War
Baltic Sea campaigns (1939–45), between the navies of Finland, Nazi Germany, and the Soviet Union during World War II
Baltic Operation of 1941 by Nazi Germany against the Soviet Union during World War II
Baltic Offensive of 1944 by the Soviet Union against Nazi Germany during World War II